Evora or Évora may refer to:

People 

 Affonso Évora (born 1918), Brazilian basketball player
 Amanda Evora (born 1984), American pairs skater
 César Évora (born 1959), Cuban actor
 Cesária Évora (1941-2011), Cape Verde singer
 Gala Évora (born 1983), Spanish singer and actress
 Nelson Évora (born 1984), Portuguese track and field athlete

Places 

Évora, a city in the Alentejo area of Portugal
Évora (district), the political district of which the city of Évora is the capital

Evora, Queensland, a locality in the Barcaldine Region

Other 

Evora, a genus of moth
Lotus Evora, British sports car, launched 2008.